Michael Paul Shaw (May 9, 1957 – September 11, 2010) was an American professional wrestler who was best known for his stint in World Championship Wrestling (WCW) as Norman the Lunatic, and as Bastion Booger in the World Wrestling Federation (WWF, now WWE).

Professional wrestling career

Canadian territories (1980–1989) 
Mike Shaw started wrestling in 1980 in Vancouver's NWA All-Star Wrestling using the ring name Klondike Mike. In 1981, he wrestled in the WWF as Mike Smith, in a losing effort against former world champion Pedro Morales on All Star Wrestling. In 1982, Shaw began wrestling under his real name for Stu Hart's Stampede Wrestling in Calgary, Alberta. In 1984, he connected with wrestler The Great Gama "Singh" and was bestowed the ring name of Makhan Singh, forming the stable "Karachi Vice" with Gama and Gary Albright as Vokhan Singh and managed by Judah Rosenbloom and following the rebirth of Stampede Wrestling in 1985, by Abu Wizal and feuded with the likes of Owen Hart, Davey Boy Smith, Bret Hart, and Chris Benoit. From 1986 to 1988 he won the Stampede Wrestling North American Heavyweight Championship three times defeating Owen Hart and losing the title back to Hart. He dropped the title the final time to Don Muraco on December 9, 1988. On December 30, 1988 he and Vokhan Singh defeated The British Bulldogs for the Stampede Wrestling International Tag Team Championship. They dropped the titles to Chris Benoit and Biff Wellington  on April 8, 1989. After the loss Shaw left Calgary.

World Championship Wrestling (1989–1991) 
Stampede Wrestling closed in December 1989 and just prior to the closure, he received the opportunity to join World Championship Wrestling as Norman the Lunatic. He was managed by Theodore Long, who led him around with a giant key. This key was symbolic of Long's potential to recommit Norman to the insane asylum he came from if he did not follow orders. Norman carried a teddy bear with him. Norman eventually broke away from Long, and turned face (being renamed Norman the Maniac). He feuded with Kevin Sullivan, and even received title shots against NWA World champion Ric Flair. He later adopted a trucker gimmick ("Trucker Norm"), ostensibly in memory of his late father, a long-haul truck driver. Shaw then wrestled in Memphis' USWA as Jed Grundy.

Global Wrestling Federation (1991) 
In 1991, Shaw wrestled in the Global Wrestling Federation under his "Makhan Singh" gimmick, where he joined The Cartel with Cactus Jack, Rip Rogers, and Scott Anthony.

Mexico (1991–1992) 
Shaw wrestled in Mexico in the 1990s as Aaron Grundy, the supposed brother of Solomon Grundy, in EMLL and on the Mexican independent scene. Solomon Grundy was an established wrestler in the promotion and in Mexico.

World Wrestling Federation (1993–1994) 
In April 1993, Shaw briefly wrestled for the World Wrestling Federation (WWF) as (alternately) The Friar and Friar Ferguson, a "mad monk". The WWF received negative feedback from the Catholic Church of New York, so they dropped the character. Shaw was then (allegedly as punishment for his weight) given the ring name Bastion Booger in June 1993, with the gimmick of an unkempt, slovenly and gluttonous man who wrestled in dingy, too-small, gray/beige singlets tailored to give him the appearance of a hunchback. Shaw's debut as Bastion Booger saw him lose to Virgil on the June 19, 1993 edition of Superstars, though he did win a rematch the following week. Booger achieved only marginal success, primarily serving as a jobber to the stars. Booger's biggest victory in the WWF was a clean pinfall over Owen Hart. Booger's only WWF pay-per-view appearance was at the 1993 Survivor Series, teaming with Bam Bam Bigelow and The Headshrinkers in a loss to Men on a Mission and The Bushwhackers. He feuded with Bam Bam Bigelow after "falling in love" with Bigelow's valet, Luna Vachon. While teaming with Bigelow on the January 3, 1994 episode of Monday Night Raw, Booger kissed Vachon, causing Bigelow to get angry. Booger and Bigelow faced each other the following week, and Bigelow won the match after Vachon distracted Booger by blowing him kisses. Booger was scheduled to appear in the 1994 Royal Rumble match, but was unable to compete kayfabe explanation was food poisoning. He lost his final match on WWF TV to Koko B. Ware in April 1994 and he left the WWF in August 1994.

Independent circuit (1994–1999) 
After leaving WWF, Shaw kept the Bastion Booger gimmick. He wrestled in the independent circuit in Michigan and Canada for Border City Wrestling. He feuded with Typhoon in 1995 in indy American promotions losing all the matches to Typhoon. On December 15, 1995 he returned to Calgary as Makhan Singh defeating the Gothic Warrior at the Stu Hart 50th Anniversary Show. On May 4, 1997 he lost to Doink the Clown at Outaia Pro Wrestling in Arnprior, Ontario. Later that summer, he worked for Renegade Wrestling Alliance based in Hamilton, also worked in Burlington and Oakville, Ontario. Shaw retired from wrestling in 1999.

Return to WWE (2007) 
On December 10, 2007 during the WWE Raw 15th anniversary special, he returned as Bastion Booger in the opening segment, in which Triple H jokingly suggested that Big Dick Johnson (another character whose unsightly physical appearance had been used by WWE for comic effect) was Booger's son. Jakks Pacific added Bastion Booger to the Classic Superstars line, series 25 in 2009.

Return to independent circuit (2006–2009) 
Shaw worked for various independent promotions in his final years, and trained several wrestlers in Saginaw, MI. He returned to wrestling on June 3, 2006 losing to Danny Demanto at National Wrestling Superstars in South River, New Jersey. His final match was in Paramus, NJ on July 24, 2009 in a losing effort against Prince Akkanatan. Shaw opened a wrestling school in his hometown of Skandia, Michigan.

Personal life and death
Shaw was married and had two children. 
Shaw died of a pulmonary embolism on September 11, 2010. He was 53 years old.

Championships and accomplishments 
 NWA All-Star Wrestling
 NWA Canadian Tag Team Championship (Vancouver version) (2 times) – with Danny O (1) and Dean Ho (1)
 Pro Wrestling Illustrated
 Ranked No. 403 of the 500 best singles wrestlers during the "PWI Years" in 2003
 Stampede Wrestling
 Stampede International Tag Team Championship (2 times) – with Vulkan Singh (1) and Jerry Morrow (1)
 Stampede North American Heavyweight Championship (3 times)
 World Wrestling Federation
 Slammy Award (1 time)
 Most Likely To See Jenny Craig (1994)
 Wrestling Observer Newsletter
 Most Embarrassing Wrestler (1993)
 Worst Worked Match of the Year (1993) with Bam Bam Bigelow and The Headshrinkers vs. The Bushwhackers and Men on a Mission at Survivor Series

References

External links
Bastion Booger Fan Website
Online World of Wrestling profile

1957 births
2010 deaths
American male professional wrestlers
People from Marquette County, Michigan
Professional wrestlers from Michigan
Stampede Wrestling alumni
20th-century professional wrestlers
21st-century professional wrestlers
Stampede Wrestling International Tag Team Champions
Stampede Wrestling North American Heavyweight Champions